This article contains the filmography of Vivian Hsu.

Filmography

TV series

Anime

Awards and nominations

External links
 Vivian Hsu at the Hong Kong Movie DataBase
 
 Vivian Hsu at Hong Kong Cinemagic
 
 

Actress filmographies
Taiwanese filmographies